is a railway station in Higashisumiyoshi-ku, Osaka, Osaka Prefecture, Japan, on the Kintetsu Minami Osaka Line.

Layout
Kita-Tanabe Station has two side platforms on the third level serving a track each.

Platforms

Adjacent stations

|-
!colspan=5|Kintetsu

Higashisumiyoshi-ku, Osaka
Railway stations in Japan opened in 1923
Railway stations in Osaka